Shai Linne (born August 21, 1974) is an American East Coast Christian rapper. Linne has been collaborating with other Christian rap artists and releasing studio albums since 2002. As of 2005, Linne has recorded studio albums under the Lamp Mode Records label.

Early life
Linne was an atheist for most of his childhood and dates his conversion to 1999. Linne is Reformed in his soteriology (doctrine of salvation), and his 2008 album The Atonement included a song "Mission Accomplished", which defended limited atonement.

Career
Linne has collaborated with Lecrae, Trip Lee, Timothy Brindle, Flame, Hazakim, and numerous other Christian rappers. He appeared on the 116 Clique album 13 Letters. In 2011, Linne was featured on "The Lord is a Warrior", the tenth track from Matt Papa's This Changes Everything.

In 2013, Linne released a controversial single called "Fal$e Teacher$", in which he criticized prosperity theology, and named those whom he regards as false teachers, including Joel Osteen, Creflo Dollar, T. D. Jakes, Benny Hinn, Paula White, and Joyce Meyer.

In addition to being recognized as a pioneer in "lyrical theology", Linne has been touted for the complexity of his rhyme schemes when rapping. According to a study performed by a Finnish doctoral candidate, Eric Malmi, Linne placed as the fourth as measured by rhyme density. The study took the lyrics of 94 artists and plugged 10,082 songs into an algorithm that Malmi created to detect assonance rhymes. Linne was preceded in the rankings only by Inspectah Deck of Wu-Tang Clan, Rakim and Redrama.

In 2016 Linne, along with Brian Davis, planted Risen Christ Fellowship in Philadelphia.
Linne is currently an assistant pastor at Del Ray Baptist Church in Alexandria, Virginia, having previously been a member of Capitol Hill Baptist Church in Washington, D.C. and Epiphany Fellowship in Philadelphia.

Personal life
Linne is married to Blair Wingo, and together they have a son.

Discography

Studio albums

References

1974 births
African-American Christians
African-American male rappers
American Calvinist and Reformed Christians
Living people
Performers of Christian hip hop music
Rappers from Philadelphia
21st-century American rappers
21st-century American male musicians
Converts to Protestantism from atheism or agnosticism
21st-century African-American musicians
20th-century African-American people